Li Ping (born 15 September 1988) is a Chinese weightlifter.

Major results

References

External links
 
 

1988 births
Living people
Chinese female weightlifters
Weightlifters at the 2010 Asian Games
Weightlifters at the 2006 Asian Games
Asian Games medalists in weightlifting
World Weightlifting Championships medalists
World record holders in Olympic weightlifting
Asian Games gold medalists for China
Weightlifters from Hunan
Sportspeople from Changsha
Medalists at the 2006 Asian Games
Medalists at the 2010 Asian Games
20th-century Chinese women
21st-century Chinese women